Shi Zongyuan (July 1946; Baoding, Hebei – March 28, 2013; Beijing), ethnic Hui, was a politician of the People's Republic of China, and former secretary of CPC Guizhou committee and chairman of Guizhou people's congress.

Biography 
Shi was studying during four years (1964–1968) in the Northwest University for Nationalities. After his graduation from the department of politics, he started working in October 1968, and joined the Communist Party of China in May 1979. He had served during ten years (1969–1979) in various posts in Hezheng County of Gansu Province before eventually becoming the mayor of Hezheng. From July 1984 to November 1986, he served as vice mayor of Linxia Hui Autonomous Prefecture of Gansu. From September 1985 to January 1986, he studied at CPC Central Party School. In November 1986, he became vice secretary of CPC Linxia committee, and was elevated to secretary in April 1988. He was appointed as director of propaganda department and a standing committee member of CPC Gansu committee. From September to November 1997, he again studied at Central Party School. In August 1998, Shi was transferred to Jilin Province and served as a standing committee member of CPC Jilin committee. He became the head of propaganda department of Jilin in October 1998. He was elevated to vice secretary of CPC Jilin committee in May 2000. In September 2000, he was appointed as director and Party chief of General Administration of Press and Publication of the People's Republic of China and the director of National Copyright Administration of the People's Republic of China. In December 2005, he became the secretary of CPC Guizhou committee, and since January 2006, Shi has served as Party chief of Guizhou and the chairman of Guizhou people's congress.

Shi was an alternate member of 14th and 15th Central Committees of Communist Party of China (1992-2002), and a full member of 16th and 17th Central Committees (2002-2012).

References 

1946 births
2013 deaths
Politicians from Baoding
People's Republic of China politicians from Hebei
Hui people
Political office-holders in Guizhou
Chinese Communist Party politicians from Hebei